Koshigaya Municipal General Gymnasium is an arena in Koshigaya, Saitama, Japan. It is the home arena of the Koshigaya Alphas of the B.League, Japan's professional basketball league.

References

Basketball venues in Japan
Indoor arenas in Japan
Otsuka Corporation Alphas
Sports venues in Saitama Prefecture
Koshigaya, Saitama
Sports venues completed in 1987
1987 establishments in Japan